The following are the football (soccer) events of the year 1970 throughout the world.

Events
Copa Libertadores 1970: Won by Estudiantes de La Plata after defeating Peñarol on an aggregate score of 1–0.
European Cup 1970: Won by Feyenoord after defeating Celtic FC by 2–1.
 In May 1970 the England captain Bobby Moore was arrested in Colombia in the Bogotá Bracelet incident shortly before the beginning of the World Cup.
 Paris Saint Germain (Paris, France) was founded.

Winners club national championship

Asia
 : Al-Oruba

Europe
 : FC Carl Zeiss Jena
 : Everton
 : AS Saint-Étienne
 : Újpest FC
 : Cagliari
 : Ajax Amsterdam
 : Sporting CP
 : Celtic
 : Atlético Madrid
 : Fenerbahçe
 : Borussia Mönchengladbach

North America

Guadalajara
Cruz Azul (México 1970)
  / :
 Rochester Lancers (NASL)

South America
 
 Boca Juniors – Metropolitano
 Independiente – Nacional
 : Fluminense

International tournaments
 African Cup of Nations in Sudan (February 6 – 16 1970)
 
 
 
1970 British Home Championship (April 18 – April 25, 1970)

 FIFA World Cup in Mexico (May 31 – June 21, 1970)
 
 
 

 1970 Asian Games in Thailand (10–20 December 1970)

Births

 January 1 – Sergei Kiriakov, Russian footballer and manager
 January 6 – Francisco Rotllán, Mexican footballer
 January 10 – Geovanis Cassiani, Colombian footballer
 January 12 – Jorge Castañeda Reyes, Mexican footballer
 January 13 – Frank Kooiman, Dutch footballer
 January 21 – Alen Bokšić, Croatian footballer
 February 2 – Erik ten Hag, Dutch football player and coach
 February 4 – Kevin Campbell, English footballer
 February 16 – Angelo Peruzzi, Italian footballer
 March 8 – Harry Decheiver, Dutch footballer
 March 30 – Rodrigo Barrera, Chilean footballer
 March 30 – Camilo Romero, Mexican footballer
 April 4 – Barry van Galen, Dutch footballer
 April 18 – Carlos López de Silanes, Mexican footballer
 April 28 – Diego Simeone, Argentinian footballer
 May 10 – David Weir, Scottish footballer
 May 13 – Fernando Vergara, Chilean footballer and manager
 June 1 – Daniel Delfino, Argentine footballer
 June 1 – Alexi Lalas, American footballer
 June 11 – Miguel Ramírez, Chilean footballer
 June 16 – Cobi Jones, American footballer
 June 18 – Mark Chung, American footballer
 June 19 – Cafú, Brazilian footballer
 July 6 – Christer Fursth, Swedish footballer
 July 11 – Iván Castillo, Bolivian footballer
 August 13 – Alan Shearer, English footballer
 August 16 – Mauricio Pozo, Chilean footballer
 August 20 – Celso Ayala, Paraguayan footballer
 August 24 – Guido Alvarenga, Paraguayan footballer
 August 28 – Mike Lapper, American footballer
 September 3 – Gareth Southgate, English footballer
 September 26 – Marco Etcheverry, Bolivian footballer
 October 1 – Gaston Taument, Dutch footballer
 October 16 – Mehmet Scholl, German footballer
 October 17 – Radoslav Samardzic, Serbian footballer
 October 22 – Winston Bogarde, Dutch footballer
 October 29 – Juan Castillo Balcázar, Chilean footballer
 November 1 – Igor Cvitanović, Croatian footballer
 November 17 – Max Huiberts, Dutch footballer
 November 29 – Mario Arteaga, Mexican footballer
 November 29 – Mark Pembridge, Welsh footballer
 December 5 – Francisco Veza, Spanish footballer
 December 11 – Chris Henderson, American footballer

Deaths

August
 August 12 - Arne Nyberg Swedish international footballer (born 1913)

September
 September 18 – Pedro Cea, Uruguayan striker, winner of the 1930 FIFA World Cup. (70)

References

 
Association football by year